Hybomys is a genus of rodent in the family Muridae endemic to Africa. 
It contains the following species:
 Eisentraut's striped mouse (Hybomys badius)
 Father Basilio's striped mouse (Hybomys basilii)
 Moon striped mouse (Hybomys lunaris)
 Miller's striped mouse (Hybomys planifrons)
 Temminck's striped mouse (Hybomys trivirgatus)
 Peters's striped mouse (Hybomys univittatus)

References

 
Rodent genera
Taxa named by Oldfield Thomas
Taxonomy articles created by Polbot